Martin Sam Milner (December 28, 1931 – September 6, 2015) was an American actor and radio host. He is best known for his performances on two television series: Route 66, which aired on CBS from 1960 to 1964, and Adam-12, which aired on NBC from 1968 to 1975.

Early years
Milner was born on December 28, 1931 in Detroit, Michigan, the son of Mildred (née Martin), a Paramount Theater circuit dancer, and Sam Gordon Milner, who worked as a construction hand and later a film distributor. Sam was a Polish-Jewish immigrant. The family left Detroit when Milner was a young child, moved frequently, and settled in Seattle, Washington by the time he was nine. There he became involved in acting, first in school, and then in a children's theater group at the Cornish Playhouse.

When Milner was a teenager, he moved with his family to Los Angeles where his parents hired an acting coach and later an agent for him. Milner had his first screen test and began his film career with his debut in the Warner Bros. film Life with Father (1947) in the role of John Day, the second oldest son of Clarence Day, played by William Powell, and Vinnie Day, portrayed by Irene Dunne. Less than two weeks after that film was completed in August 1946, Milner contracted polio. He recovered within a year and had bit parts in two more films, then graduated from North Hollywood High School in 1949. He immediately landed a minor role in the film Sands of Iwo Jima starring John Wayne.

Career
Milner attended the University of Southern California where he studied theater. He dropped out after a year in the fall of 1950 to concentrate on acting. He made his first television appearance in 1950 as a guest star in episode 28 titled "Pay Dirt" on The Lone Ranger. The same year, he began a recurring role as Drexel Potter on the sitcom The Stu Erwin Show.

He had several more roles, both minor and major, in war films in the 1950s, including another John Wayne picture titled Operation Pacific (1951) and Mister Roberts (1955), with William Powell and Henry Fonda, James Cagney and Jack Lemmon. On the set of Halls of Montezuma (1950), he met and befriended actor Jack Webb, and he began intermittent work on Webb's radio series Dragnet.

In 1952, Milner began a two-year stint in the United States Army. Assigned to Special Services at Fort Ord on California's Monterey Bay Peninsula, he directed training films and was both an emcee and performer in skits for a touring unit created to entertain soldiers. Milner was encouraged by fellow soldier and future actor David Janssen to pursue an acting career when his time in the Army ended. Jansen and Milner served at Fort Ord with fellow future actors Clint Eastwood and Richard Long. While in the Army, Milner continued working for Jack Webb, playing Officer Bill Lockwood (briefly the partner of Sgt. Friday) and other characters on the Dragnet radio series on weekends. He also appeared on six episodes of Webb's Dragnet television series between 1952 and 1955.

After his military service ended, Milner had a recurring role on The Life of Riley from 1953 to 1958. He also made guest appearances on numerous television shows, including episodes of The Bigelow Theatre, The Great Gildersleeve, TV Reader's Digest, Science Fiction Theatre, Westinghouse Desilu Playhouse, NBC Matinee Theater, The West Point Story, The Twilight Zone (episode: "Mirror Image"), Wagon Train and Rawhide.

Milner was under contract at Hecht-Lancaster, Burt Lancaster’s production company. He also acted in films, including The Long Gray Line (1955), Mister Roberts (1955), Gunfight at the O.K. Corral (1957), Sweet Smell of Success (1957), Marjorie Morningstar (1958), Compulsion (1959), and 13 Ghosts (1960). He later costarred in Valley of the Dolls (1967), based on the best-selling novel by Jacqueline Susann.

Route 66

In 1960, Milner was cast as Tod Stiles on the television series Route 66, which ran from 1960 to 1964. Created by Stirling Silliphant, Route 66 is about two regular but distinctly different young men in a car touring the United States. After the sudden death of his father left him penniless, Milner's character travels across the United States in a Chevrolet Corvette, taking a variety of odd jobs along the way and getting involved in other people's problems. His traveling partner on his escapades is his friend Buz Murdock (played by George Maharis), a former employee of his father's. During the series' third season, Glenn Corbett replaced Maharis.

Route 66 was shot on location, so Milner spent nearly four years traveling the U.S. for the series, sometimes taking his wife and children along.

Milner appeared on Broadway once in the short-lived comedy The Ninety Day Mistress in 1967.

Adam-12
By the mid-60's, Milner and Jack Webb had a long-established working relationship. Milner had appeared in numerous episodes of both the radio and television versions of the series Dragnet, and had worked with Webb in the films Halls of Montezuma (1950) and Pete Kelly's Blues (1955).

In 1968, Milner returned to television as seven-year LAPD veteran uniform patrol Officer Peter Joseph "Pete" Malloy in Adam-12, a Webb-produced police drama. Kent McCord played his partner, rookie Officer James A. "Jim" Reed. The series ran from 1968 to 1975. Like Webb's Dragnet, it was based on real Los Angeles Police Department procedures and cases.

Milner was Webb's choice for Pete Malloy in part because of his relative youth and prior acting credits and because of his on-camera driving experience from his days on Route 66. He guest-starred in three episodes of Emergency! between 1972 and 1976, during and after Adam-12s run on NBC, the best known and first of which was the pilot movie The Wedsworth-Townsend Act.

Later career

In 1971, Milner portrayed the murder victim in the  premiere episode of Columbo titled "Murder by the Book". After Adam-12, Milner starred as Karl Robinson in a television series version of The Swiss Family Robinson (1975–1976), produced by Irwin Allen. Most of his later work was as a guest star, including MacGyver (as the protagonist's father); Airwolf; Murder, She Wrote; and RoboCop: The Series. In 1983, Milner hosted a morning radio wake-up show on AM 600 KOGO in San Diego.

In 1990, Milner teamed again with Kent McCord in the cable TV-movie Nashville Beat (1990), on The Nashville Network. The story was co-written by McCord, who cast himself as an LAPD detective who works with his former partner, played by Milner, in Nashville, Tennessee. In 1992, Milner guest-starred on five episodes of ABC's Life Goes On. 

After retiring from acting, Milner co-hosted a radio show about fishing called Let's Talk Hook-Up on San Diego-area sports station XETRA AM 690 (now XEWW). 

In 1998, Milner took part in a documentary film, Route 66: Return to the Road with Martin Milner, in which he drove a 1961 Corvette from Chicago to Santa Monica.

Personal life
In May 1956, Milner met singer and actress Judith Bess Jones at a Hollywood dinner party. They were married on February 23, 1957 in Waukegan, Illinois; together they had four children.

In February 2003, Milner's eldest daughter Amy, who appeared in an episode of Adam 12, was diagnosed with acute myeloid leukemia. She died in December 2004.

On September 6, 2015, Milner died of heart failure at his home in Carlsbad, California at age 83. Milner's remains were cremated.

Filmography

Film

Television

References

Sources

External links

 
 
 Martin Milner at Turner Classic Movies
 

1931 births
2015 deaths
20th-century American male actors
American male film actors
American male radio actors
American male stage actors
American male television actors
American people of Polish-Jewish descent
Male actors from Detroit
Male actors from Seattle
United States Army personnel of the Korean War
Military personnel from Detroit
People with polio
USC School of Dramatic Arts alumni
North Hollywood High School alumni